Jean-Baptiste Andrea is a French novelist, film director and screenwriter. He grew up in Cannes, where he started making short films. He later moved to Paris and graduated in political science and economics. In Paris, he met Fabrice Canepa, and the two of them began writing films together. Together, they wrote and directed the cult horror film Dead End.

His debut novel, Ma Reine (My Queen), was published in 2017 and won a dozen awards, including Best French Debut Novel and the Students Femina. His third novel, Des diables et des saints, also received multiple awards, including the Grand Prix RTL-Lire.

Bibliography
2021: Devils and Saints
2019: A Hundred Million Years and a Day
2017: Ma Reine

Filmography
2021: King (writer)
2013: Brotherhood of Tears (writer, director)
2007: Hellphone (writer)
2006: Big Nothing (writer, director)
2003: Dead End (writer, director, with Fabrice Canepa)
Brighter Than The Sun (music video) - Consumer Republic
Take The Money and Run (music video) - Trank

References

External links

French film directors
French screenwriters
Living people
1971 births
People from Saint-Germain-en-Laye
Sciences Po alumni
ESCP Europe alumni